John Alcorn (born 27 July 1964 in Romford, Essex) is a retired British race car driver. He attempted to qualify for two rounds of the 1987 International Formula 3000 season for Colin Bennett Racing at Le Mans and Jarama, failing on both occasions.

Racing record

Complete International Formula 3000 results 
(key) (Races in bold indicate pole position) (Races in italics indicate fastest lap)

References 

1964 births
International Formula 3000 drivers
Living people
English racing drivers